Lisa Kristine (born September 2, 1965) is an American humanitarian photographer, activist, and speaker. Her photography has documented indigenous cultures and social causes, such as modern slavery, in more than 100 countries. Through her work, Kristine has supported numerous charities and humanitarian organizations. Kristine has delivered keynote and appeared on panels at conferences held at the Vatican, United Nations, Thomson Reuters, Trust London. She is a member of the Explorer's Club.

Kristine has published six books and has been the subject of four documentaries. Kristine is the recipient of the 2013 Lucie Humanitarian Award. In 2017, she founded Human Thread Foundation to promote human dignity through educating the public and driving awareness about social causes. In 2019, her exhibition on human trafficking was inaugurated by Pope Francis at the Vatican.

Career in photography

Kristine began learning photography at age 11. Inspired as a child while looking at images of indigenous people in her mother's anthropology.

She graduated at 18 from the Fashion Institute of Design & Merchandising in San Francisco and immediately left for Europe. Although the two-year Fashion Institute program had taught her a lot about color, design, and graphics, she says, "I recognized that [fashion] wasn’t going to be for me."

She traveled through Europe, North Africa, and Asia making photographs. She especially gravitated to and responded to the bold colors of Asia. Shortly thereafter, she says, her work became more purposeful. She researched ancient cultures, including how they found meaning, whether through conventional religion, philosophy, or animism.

As a professional photographer, Kristine began traveling internationally in the early 1980s. She has visited countries on six continents and is focused on topics related to human rights and, in particular, modern slavery. Kristine is known to spend months connecting with her subjects by traveling with a translator to ensure the subjects' permission before documenting them on film.

In 2009, she collaborated with Free the Slaves on a body of work about human enslavement, published as Slavery (2010).

Kristine was the recipient of the 2013 Lucie Humanitarian Award. She has given a TED talk (Photos That Bear Witness to Modern Slavery, which has been viewed nearly 3 million times) and has also written for the Atlantic.

In 2015, Resource Magazine recognized her as one of the 12 top tier portrait photographers. In 2016, she gave the keynote at the Thomson Reuters Trust Conference and she gave the keynote at Thomson Reuters 2017 Anti-Slavery Summit in Hong Kong. Her work has been endorsed by Archbishop Desmond Tutu, the Queen Mother of Bhutan, and Amnesty International.

When the State of the World Forum convened in San Francisco in 1999, Kristine presented her work to help inspire discussions on human rights, social change, and global security. Her work was auctioned by Christie's New York and sponsored by the United Nations to benefit Kofi Annan's Ambassador's Ball. In 2016 the National Underground Railroad Freedom Center received an award for best exhibit from the Ohio Museums Association, in showing Kristine's Enslaved exhibition. Kristine was the sole exhibitor at the 2009 Vancouver Peace Summit.

Kristine lent her support to a global 50forFreedom campaign to end modern slavery, launched by the International Labour Organization.

Her work on slavery was featured in three films released in 2014. One of these films, Sold, directed by Jeffrey D. Brown and Emma Thompson includes a character inspired by Kristine and is portrayed by Gillian Anderson. In 2017, Kristine published her sixth book, entitled Bound to Freedom: Slavery to Liberation.

In 2017, Kristine founded Human Thread Foundation to promote human dignity through educating the public and driving awareness about social causes.

In 2018 Kristine's work inspired a worksheet for 7th to 10th graders for world history, civics and visual arts through Literacy & Empathy: Learning Activity for Ted Talks on Modern-Day slavery resulted in a worksheet created and designed with literacy strategies for understanding slavery through Kristine's TED talk.

In February 2015, Kristine's exhibition entitled Modern Slavery was presented at Kogart House Museum in Budapest, Hungary. The First Lady, Anita Herczegh, wife of President János Áder, the main patron of the exhibition, took part in the opening of the exhibition, which was open for two months and presented 55 photos.

The National Underground Railroad Freedom Center announced the opening of Enslaved: A Visual Story of Modern Day Slavery on Saturday, May 7, 2016. The exhibit featured images by Kristine that not only document the lives endured by slaves but also their freedom.

In February 2017 Kristine's EnSlaved exhibition was held at the Smithsonian Affiliate's, National Civil Rights Museum in Memphis.

On May 10, 2019, Pope Francis officially blessed and inaugurated Kristine's exhibition, Nuns Healing Hearts, at the Vatican. The exhibition focused on the Talitha Kum nuns who combat human trafficking around the world. The images were taken in more than six countries and were a culmination of a nearly two-year project. In 2019, Kristine's exhibition launched in July at the United Nations in New York City. The exhibition was opened by Princess Takamado of the Japanese Imperial Family on November 22 at the Mitsubishi Gallery in Japan.

Publications

A Human Thread. San Francisco: Migration, 2002
This Moment. San Francisco: Migration, 2002
  With a foreword by Archbishop Desmond Tutu.
 
 
Bound to Freedom: Slavery to Liberation. Goff. . With a foreword by Pope Francis.

Films
A Human Thread (2003) – documentary on Kristine, produced by MediaStorm. DVD.
Through the Lens (2007) – documentary on Kristine, produced by MediaStorm. DVD.
In Plain Sight (2014) – documentary, produced by Pivitol Eye
#standwithme – documentary, produced by Stillmotion
Sold (2014) – feature film, produced by Jane Charles, directed by Jeffrey D. Brown

References

External links
 

1965 births
Living people
American women photographers
21st-century American women